Lake Michigan Beach is an unincorporated community in Berrien County in the U.S. state of Michigan. It is a census-designated place (CDP) for statistical purposes, without any legal status as a municipality. The population was 1,216 at the 2010 census.

The community is in Hagar Township on the shore of Lake Michigan. The area is also known as Hagar Shores.

History
Lake Michigan Beach was established in 1922. It was originally primarily a summer resort but later became a village with 1,200 permanent residents. The Hagar Shores name came about in 1958 when the post office rejected the name Lake Michigan Beach.

Geography

Demographics

As of the census of 2000, there were 1,509 people, 635 households, and 405 families residing in the CDP. The racial makeup of the CDP was 96.16% White, 0.73% Black or African American, 1.33% Native American, 0.20% Asian, 0.93% from other races, and 0.66% from two or more races. Hispanic or Latino of any race were 2.12% of the population.

There were 635 households, out of which 30.1% had children under the age of 18 living with them, 48.0% were married couples living together, 10.9% had a female householder with no husband present, and 36.1% were non-families. 29.1% of all households were made up of individuals, and 8.3% had someone living alone who was 65 years of age or older.  The average household size was 2.38 and the average family size was 2.93.

In the CDP, the population was spread out, with 24.8% under the age of 18, 8.3% from 18 to 24, 30.2% from 25 to 44, 24.3% from 45 to 64, and 12.4% who were 65 years of age or older.  The median age was 37 years. For every 100 females, there were 97.3 males.  For every 100 females age 18 and over, there were 95.0 males.

The median income for a household in the CDP was $33,150, and the median income for a family was $39,196. Males had a median income of $34,271 versus $25,054 for females. The per capita income for the CDP was $20,253.  About 6.5% of families and 7.7% of the population were below the poverty line, including 1.7% of those under age 18 and 3.4% of those age 65 or over.

References

Unincorporated communities in Berrien County, Michigan
Census-designated places in Michigan
1922 establishments in Michigan
Unincorporated communities in Michigan
Census-designated places in Berrien County, Michigan